The Lost Sermon is a 1914 American silent short drama film starring William Garwood, Harry von Meter, Jack Richardson Vivian Rich and Louise Lester. It was based on a story written by Eleanor Talbot Kinkead.

Cast
Harry De Vere
Reaves Eason
William Garwood
Louise Lester
Jack Richardson
Vivian Rich
Harry von Meter

External links

1914 films
1914 drama films
Silent American drama films
American silent short films
American black-and-white films
1914 short films
American Film Company films
1910s American films